Ross Andrew McCollum (born 11 January 1964 in Belfast, Northern Ireland) is an Irish cricketer.  He made his List A debut for Ireland national cricket team against Gloucestershire County Cricket Club in June 1988 at County Ground, Bristol.

McCollum is chairman of Cricket Ireland since 2010.

References

External links
 
 Cricketarchive

1964 births
Cricketers from Belfast
Irish cricketers
Cricketers from Northern Ireland
Irish cricket administrators
Living people